Kansri Boonpragob is a lichenologist and climatologist from Thailand, who leads the Lichen Research Unit at Ramkhamhaeng University.

Career 

Boonpragob is Head of the Lichen Research Unit and Assistant Professor of Biological Science at Ramkhamhaeng University. She has published widely, including several books and dozens of articles. She also has a PhD in Ecology. During 2007 she held a post as Vice-Chair of the Intergovernmental Panel on Climate Change's Working Group I. Boonpragob's research has demonstrated that there are already severe economic impacts on Thailand due to the ongoing climate crisis. Much of this impact is on coastal regions, where livelihoods as well as species, are at risk. She is a member of the Graphidaceae Project, administered by the Field Museum. In 2008 she organized the first workshop on thelotremoid Graphidaceae in Thailand. She is a member of the Editorial Board for the Journal of Tropical Forest Research.

The lichen Ocellularia kansriae is named after Boonpragob, who collected specimens from Eastern Thailand.

References 

Kansri Boonpragob
Kansri Boonpragob
Kansri Boonpragob
Ecologists
Women ecologists
Year of birth missing (living people)
Living people
Kansri Boonpragob
Kansri Boonpragob
Kansri Boonpragob